Akureyrarkirkja (regionally also ) or The Church of Akureyri is a prominent Lutheran church at Akureyri in northern Iceland. Located in the centre of the city, it was designed by Guðjón Samúelsson (1887–1950)  and completed in 1940. 

Akureyrarkirkja contains a notably large 3200-pipe organ. The bas-reliefs on the nave balcony are by sculptor Ásmundur Sveinsson (1893–1982). The altarpiece dates to  1863 and was designed  by Danish artist Edvard Lehmann (1815–1892). The windows were designed and made by J. Wippel & Co. of Exeter,  Devon in Britain. 
The Italian white marble  baptismal font is made by  Florentine sculptor Corrado Vigni (1888–1956). The angel  baptismal font is a replica of a work by noted Danish sculptor Bertel Thorvaldsen (1770–1844). The original work is situated at Copenhagen Cathedral (Vor Frue Kirke).

In 2017, the church was vandalized, and incurred 20 million ISK in damage.

References

External links

Official site
Akureyrarkirkja on the Icelandic Church Map

Churches completed in 1940
Churches in Iceland
Buildings and structures in Akureyri

de:Akureyri#Akureyrarkirkja